Jaroslav Moučka (9 November 1923 in Studená – 26 December 2009 in Prague) was a Czech actor. He performed in more than eighty films between 1954 and 2000.

Selected filmography

References

External links
 

1923 births
2009 deaths
Czech male stage actors
Czech male film actors
Czech male television actors